Mece may refer to:

People
 Neti Meçe (born 1995), Albanian football player

Places
 Mece, Croatia
 Mecé, France

Other
 MECE principle, mutually exclusive and collectively exhaustive